Dagmar Hase (born 22 December 1969 in Quedlinburg, Saxony-Anhalt, East Germany) is a former German swimmer, specialised in the freestyle and backstroke. She won seven Olympic medals in her career, including a gold medal in the 400 m freestyle at the 1992 Summer Olympics.

Her defeat of American swimmer Janet Evans in the 400 metre freestyle at the 1992 Barcelona Olympics was Evans's only loss in a 400 or 800 metre freestyle between 1986 and 1994.   She also defeated the greatest backstroker ever, Hungary's Krisztina Egerszegi, in her strongest event the 200 metre backstroke at the 1989 European Aquatics Championships.  This was Egerszegi's only defeat in a 200-metre backstroke from 1987 to her retirement in 1996, and her only defeat in any backstroke event from 1989 to 1994.   Hase was a highly versatile swimmer, having won at least 1 Olympic and numerous other major event medals in each of the 200 freestyle, 400 freestyle, 800 freestyle, and 200 backstroke.

See also
 List of German records in swimming

References

External links
Official website 

1969 births
Living people
East German female swimmers
German female swimmers
German female backstroke swimmers
German female freestyle swimmers
Olympic swimmers of Germany
Swimmers at the 1992 Summer Olympics
Swimmers at the 1996 Summer Olympics
Olympic gold medalists for Germany
Olympic silver medalists for Germany
Olympic bronze medalists for Germany
Medalists at the 1992 Summer Olympics
Medalists at the 1996 Summer Olympics
People from Quedlinburg
Olympic bronze medalists in swimming
World Aquatics Championships medalists in swimming
Medalists at the FINA World Swimming Championships (25 m)
European Aquatics Championships medalists in swimming
Olympic gold medalists in swimming
Olympic silver medalists in swimming
Sportspeople from Saxony-Anhalt